If I Were You is an extended play by Canadian country pop artist David James. It was released on March 13, 2020 via MDM Recordings and Universal Music Canada. It includes the previously released singles "Cars, Girls, And The Radio", "All The Time", and "If I Were You".

Track listing

Charts

Release history

References

2020 EPs
MDM Recordings albums
Universal Music Canada albums
Country pop EPs